Khanduri ministry may refer to:

First Khanduri ministry, the 4th government of Uttarakhand headed by B. C. Khanduri from 2007 to 2009
Second Khanduri ministry, the 6th government of Uttarakhand headed by B. C. Khanduri from 2011 to 2012

See also 
B. C. Khanduri